The 1997 Tippeligaen was the 53rd completed season of top division football in Norway. Each team played 26 games with 3 points given for wins and 1 for draws. Number thirteen and fourteen are relegated, number twelve has to play two qualification matches (home and away) against number three in the first division (where number one and two are directly promoted) for the last spot.

Teams and locations
''Note: Table lists in alphabetical order.

League table 
Vålerenga Fotball qualified for the Cup Winners' Cup as Norwegian Cup winners from a lower division.

Relegation play-offs
Tromsø won the play-offs against Eik-Tønsberg, 6–1 on aggregate.

Results

Season statistics

Top scorers

Attendances

References 

Eliteserien seasons
Norway
Norway
1